Cyganka may refer to:

Places
Cyganka, Lublin Voivodeship (east Poland)
Cyganka, Masovian Voivodeship (east-central Poland)
Cyganka, Żyrardów County in Masovian Voivodeship (east-central Poland)
Cyganka, Silesian Voivodeship (south Poland)
Cyganka, Pomeranian Voivodeship (north Poland)

Entertainment
 The Gypsy Girl, a 1953 Yugoslav film